Child's Pose is a 2013 Romanian drama film directed by Călin Peter Netzer. The film premiered in competition at the 63rd Berlin International Film Festival where it won the Golden Bear. It was screened in the Contemporary World Cinema section at the 2013 Toronto International Film Festival. Luminița Gheorghiu was nominated as the Best Actress at the 26th European Film Awards and the film won the Telia Film Award at the Stockholm International Film Festival 2013. The film was selected as the Romanian entry for the Best Foreign Language Film at the 86th Academy Awards, but it was not nominated.

Cast
 Luminița Gheorghiu as Cornelia Keneres, Mother
 Vlad Ivanov as Dinu Laurențiu
 Florin Zamfirescu as Domnul Făgărășanu
 Bogdan Dumitrache as Barbu, Son
 Ilinca Goia as Carmen
 Natașa Raab as Olga Cerchez
 Adrian Titieni as Father
 Mimi Brănescu as Policeman

Reception

Critical reception
On review aggregator website Rotten Tomatoes, the film has a "certified fresh" approval rating of 91% based on 79 reviews, and an average rating of 7.5/10. The website's critical consensus reads, "It isn't necessarily an easy watch, but thanks to Netzer's interesting direction and a riveting performance from Gheorghiu, Childs Pose is rewarding." On Metacritic, the film has a weighted average score of 77 out of 100, based on 23 critics, indicating "generally favorable reviews".

Controversy
The film was initially refused financing by the Romanian film board due its controversial depiction of the Hungarian minority in Romania. After an intervention by the Minister of Culture, Hunor Kelemen the ruling of the film board was overruled.

Awards
2013: Golden Bear, Berlinale
2013: Telia Film Award, Stockholm International Film Festival

See also
 Romanian New Wave
 List of submissions to the 86th Academy Awards for Best Foreign Language Film
 List of Romanian submissions for the Academy Award for Best Foreign Language Film

References

External links
 
 

2013 films
2013 drama films
Romanian drama films
2010s Romanian-language films
Golden Bear winners
Films directed by Călin Peter Netzer
Films set in Bucharest